Olliffe (also spelt Oliff, Olliff and Oliffe) is a rare English surname of Scandinavian origin derived from the Old Norse personal name Ōleifr meaning "ancestral relic" or "heirloom". Olliffe is a version of Ōleifr that has not been gaelicised unlike the Irish and Scottish derivations such as McAuliffe and McAuley. In England, the majority of people with the surname are descended from the Buckinghamshire Olliffes, the earliest traceable ancestors of which lived in the village of Bierton, near Aylesbury, in the mid-16th century.

People
Arthur Sidney Olliff (1865-1895), Australian taxonomist
David Olliffe (born 1975), Australian musician
John Olliff, English tennis player
Joseph Francis Olliffe (1808-1869), Irish physician
Pat Olliffe, American comic book artist and penciller
Richard Oliff (born 1955) British broadcaster, author and journalist
Steve Oliff (born 1954), American comic book artist

References

Surnames
Surnames of Scandinavian origin